Mohd Faizal Yusup (13 June 19781 January 2011) was a Malaysian actor. He appeared in some Malay television series, including Jersi 9, Adamaya, Tiramisu and Manjalara.

Faizal died on 1 January 2011. He is survived by his second wife Rosmunira Rashid who was five months pregnant at the time of his death. He was previously married to singer Siti Nordiana with whom he had a son, Mohd Rayyan Nakhaie.

Filmography

Film

Television series

Telemovie

Awards and nominations

References

External links
 

1978 births
2011 deaths
Malaysian male actors